Tiger Style Records is an independent record label located in New York City, New York. It is owned and operated by Insound. As of 2004, it is on hiatus.

Roster
764-HERO
The Album Leaf
American Analog Set
The Appleseed Cast
Aspera Ad Astra
Broken Spindles
Convocation of...
Dead Low Tide
Her Space Holiday
Entrance
Ida
James Chance
Lucero
The Mercury Program
Nanang Tatang
Rye Coalition
Speedking (band)
Tristeza
Those Peabodys

See also
 List of record labels

Notes

External links
 Official site

American independent record labels
Indie rock record labels